(born 1963) is a Japanese hemp rights advocate, considered "one of Japan’s leading experts on cannabis". He is the curator of the Taima Hakubutsukan (Cannabis Museum) in Nasu, Tochigi Prefecture, which he founded in 2001. He also organizes an annual tour to the legal farms around the museum, and a monthly workshop to teach cannabis fiber weavering.

Biography
At age 3, Junichi Takayasu read a picture book with ninjas jumping over marijuana plants, which set his mind on becoming a cannabis grower later in his life.

References

See also
Cannabis in Japan

Japanese cannabis activists
Japanese curators
1963 births
People from Tochigi Prefecture
Living people